David Cowper may refer to:
 David Cowper (cricketer), Australian cricketer
 David Scott Cowper, British yachtsman
 Dave Cowper, Australian rugby union player